Burleigh County is a county in the U.S. state of North Dakota. As of the 2020 census, the population was 98,458, making it the second-most populous county in North Dakota. Its county seat is Bismarck, the state capital. The county was named for Dakota Territory political figure Walter A. Burleigh.

History
The territorial legislature created Burleigh County on January 4, 1873, annexing territory from Buffalo County. Burleigh was not organized at that time, but the organization was effected on July 16, 1873. Its boundaries were altered in 1879, 1881, 1883, and twice in 1885.

Burleigh County is included in the Bismarck, ND Metropolitan Statistical Area, commonly called "Bismarck–Mandan".

Geography
The Missouri River flows south-southeasterly along the lower west boundary line of Burleigh County. The central part of the county is drained by south-flowing creeks. The county terrain consists of semi-arid low rolling hills, partially devoted to agriculture. The terrain slopes to the south, and its western portion also slopes to the river valley. The terrain's highest point is on the upper portion of the east boundary line, at 2,060' (628m) ASL.

Major highways

Adjacent counties

 Sheridan County – north
 Kidder County – east
 Emmons County – south
 Morton County - southwest
 Oliver County – west
 McLean County – northwest

Protected areas

 Arena State Game Management Area
 Bunker Lake State Game Management Area
 Canfield Lake National Wildlife Refuge
 Florence Lake National Wildlife Refuge
 Long Lake National Wildlife Refuge (part)
 Sibley Nature Park
 Wilton Mine State Game Management Area (part)

Lakes

 Bunce Lake
 Bunker Lake
 Clear Lake
 Florence Lake
 Grass Lake
 Harriet Lake
 Horseshoe Lake
 Lonetree Lake
 Long Lake
 Mitchell Lake
 New Johns Lake (part)
 O'Brien Lake
 Pelican Lake
 Rice Lake

Demographics

As of the 2010 census, there were 81,308 people, 33,976 households, and 21,213 families in the county. The racial makeup of the county was 93.0% white, 4.2% American Indian, 0.6% black or African American, 0.5% Asian, 0.3% from other races, and 1.4% from two or more races. Those of Hispanic or Latino origin made up 1.2% of the population. In terms of ancestry, 61.0% were German, 21.1% were Norwegian, 8.1% were Russian, 6.8% were Irish, and 2.6% were American.

Of the 33,976 households, 29.0% had children under the age of 18 living with them, 50.2% were married couples living together, 8.7% had a female householder with no husband present, 37.6% were non-families, and 30.5% of all households were made up of individuals. The average household size was 2.31 and the average family size was 2.90. The median age was 37.3 years.

The median income for a household in the county was $53,465 and the median income for a family was $71,103. Males had a median income of $44,944 versus $31,943 for females. The per capita income for the county was $28,784. About 6.3% of families and 9.4% of the population were below the poverty line, including 11.6% of those under age 18 and 11.0% of those age 65 or over.

Population by decade

Communities

Cities

 Bismarck (county seat)
 Lincoln
 Regan
 Wilton (partly in McLean County)
 Wing

Census-designated places
 Apple Valley
 Driscoll
 Menoken

Unincorporated communities

 Arena
 Baldwin
 Brittin
 McKenzie
 Moffit
 Sterling

Townships

 Apple Creek
 Boyd
 Burnt Creek
 Canfield
 Christiania
 Clear Lake
 Crofte
 Cromwell
 Driscoll
 Ecklund
 Estherville
 Florence Lake
 Francis
 Ghylin
 Gibbs
 Glenview
 Grass Lake
 Harriet-Lien
 Hay Creek
 Hazel Grove
 Logan
 Long Lake
 McKenzie
 Menoken
 Missouri
 Morton
 Naughton
 Painted Woods
 Richmond
 Rock Hill
 Schrunk
 Sibley Butte
 Steiber
 Sterling
 Taft
 Telfer
 Thelma
 Trygg
 Wild Rose
 Wilson
 Wing

Politics
Burleigh County voters have voted Republican for several decades. With the exception of 1964, no Democratic Party candidate has received even 40 percent of the county's vote after 1940.

Education
School districts include:

K-12:

 Bismarck Public School District 1
 Hazelton-Moffit-Braddock Public School District 6
 Kidder County School District 1
 McClusky Public School District 19
 Wilton Public School District 1
 Wing Public School District 28

Elementary:

 Apple Creek Public School District 39
 Manning Public School District 45
 Menoken Public School District 33
 Naughton Public School District 25
 Sterling Public School District 35

Former districts:
 Montefiore Public School District 1

See also
 National Register of Historic Places listings in Burleigh County, North Dakota

References

External links
 A brief history of Burleigh County : with a chronology of some of the county's earlier days (1932) from the Digital Horizons website
 A brief history of Burleigh County : with a chronology of some of the outstanding events of the county's earlier days (1932) from the Digital Horizons website
 Burleigh County maps, Sheet 1 (northern) and Sheet 2 (southern), North Dakota DOT

 
Bismarck–Mandan
North Dakota counties on the Missouri River
1873 establishments in Dakota Territory
Populated places established in 1873